Hans Schneider may refer to:

 Hans Schneider (ice hockey) (1913–1993), Austrian ice hockey player
 Hans Schneider (mathematician) (1927–2014), mathematician in the United States
 Hans Schneider (water polo) (1909–1972), German water polo player
Hans Ernst Schneider (1909–1999), German professor of literature under the alias Hans Schwerte
 Hans Ernst Schneider (athlete) (1927–2014), Swiss sprinter
 Hans Joachim Schneider (1928–2015), German jurist, criminologist and psychologist
 Hans Schneider (footballer), Swiss footballer
 Hans-Rudolf Schneider (born 1956), Swiss sports shooter
 Johannes "Hans" Schneider (1887–1914), German footballer